Store Trolltind a mountain summit in Rauma Municipality in Møre og Romsdal county, Norway. At  in height, it is the highest point along the Trolltindane ridge. The Rauma River and the European route E136 highway lie  to the east in the valley.

Directly beneath the summit, one might prefer a rope for securing the last climb.

See also
List of mountains of Norway

References

Mountains of Møre og Romsdal
Rauma, Norway